Parcel audit (also referred to as small package auditing or small parcel auditing) is the process of reviewing shipping invoices for invalid charges and other billing inaccuracies. Each shipment tendered to a major parcel carrier like UPS and FedEx come with service guarantees outlined within each carrier's tariff or service guide. An increasing number of businesses contract third-party companies to perform these services because they have the technology necessary to automate the otherwise time-consuming process.

Parcel invoices
Parcel carriers like UPS, FedEx, and DHL often have large, long, and complicated invoices. A customer shipping a high volume of parcel boxes via one of these carriers sees invoices hundreds of pages long. The invoices show a high amount of visibility to how a package was carried and delivered. This finite data is collected by UPS and FedEx for tracking purposes and to automate the process of charging the appropriate amount to their clients.

Invoicing process: errors and overbills
The invoicing process is so automated that mistakes happen often. Insiders to UPS and FedEx claim that little focus is spent to prevent billing for inappropriate charges: duplicate charges, incorrect discount amounts, and phantom accessorial charges. Invoicing errors are a common phenomenon, and most large carriers provide teams and electronic forms to contest improper charges on invoices. With the proper data to dispute the charges, they are often credited in a matter of hours.

Overbilling - or service failures - is a larger problem than invoicing errors. A service failure occurs when a package with a time-sensitive guarantee is delivered late and a refund is due to the client. Most carriers like UPS and FedEx place the responsibility on the customer to check the timeliness of the delivered package. Once the service failure is found, the carrier typically credits the amount due quickly. The terms and conditions for claiming a late package are stated and the act of claiming a refund is also time-sensitive.

Published savings rates

Up to 5% of a clients UPS and/or FedEx charges are due to errors or overbilled items. This results in around $2 billion of unclaimed refunds.

How to implement audit
Customers forward their electronic billing file or approve their carriers to send the electronic billing files directly to the auditor. Most auditors accept all forms of electronic billing files. Customers may request these files from their carriers.

Competition in the parcel audit industry

The parcel auditing industry, otherwise knows as small package audit, has been growing in popularity. Most auditors operate using a performance-based model.

References

Accounting source documents
Transport systems
Freight transport